Tajpaul Singh Chowdhry (Punjabi: ਤਜਪੌਲ ਸਿੰਘ ਚੋਦਰੀ, born 21 August 1974), better known as Paul Chowdhry, is an English comedian and actor. He is of Indian Punjabi Sikh descent. He began his stand up career in 1998 and hosted the Channel 4 comedy series Stand Up for the Week as of the fifth series, having been a regular act for the third and fourth series. Chowdhry was the first British act to perform at the Caribbean Comedy Festival in Trinidad in 2003. He has been a guest panelist on 8 out of 10 Cats, Comedy World Cup, and Sorry, I Didn't Know. He has appeared on Live at the Apollo twice, in 2012 and 2015. In 2016, he was one of the contestants on series three of the comedy show Taskmaster. In 2017, he was a guest stand-up performer in The Russell Howard Hour and also sold out the 10,000-seater Wembley Arena, becoming the first British Asian stand-up comic to do so. In 2020, Chowdhry appeared in the television drama series Devils. Since 2021, he has been hosting the podcast The Paul Chowdhry PudCast, in which he interviews comedians. He uses the signature phrase "what's happening white people?" at the start of his stand-up routines.

Influences 
He lists his influences as: "Richard Pryor, Eddie Murphy, George Carlin and Sam Kinnison. Then Morecambe and Wise, Little and Large and Bruce Forsyth from the UK definitely inspired me to get into comedy."

Personal life
Chowdhry makes an effort to keep fit during touring, telling Coach Magazine: "I don't eat chapattis, even though I’m Indian" – and replacing them with higher-protein substitutes like bulgur wheat and quinoa. "If I only had ten minutes to work out, I’d do high-intensity abs training. ” alongside speaking about his battles with mental health in the New Statesman, "Mental health problems aren’t really discussed in the Asian community." Talking to the South China Morning Post, "People see you as an Asian comedian, whereas the other two guys coming to Hong Kong [Sean Meo and Michael McIntyre] aren't Asian comedians – they're just British. But they're not referred to as 'English white comedians'. 'I'm British. I was born in England. The fact that I'm Asian has very little to do with my stand-up, although it would have an influence for an obvious reason because of the way I'm perceived by certain people. So I play on the stereotypes and try to change them.'"

Filmography

Stand-Up DVDs
 What's Happening White People? (19 November 2012)
 PC's World (30 November 2015)

See also 
 List of British Sikhs

References

External links
 
 

1974 births
Living people
British people of Indian descent
British people of Punjabi descent
British Sikhs
English people of Indian descent
English people of Punjabi descent
English Sikhs
British comedians
British stand-up comedians
Punjabi people
English stand-up comedians
Male actors from London
Comedians from London
British male actors of Indian descent
20th-century English comedians
21st-century English comedians